The 2009 Challenger Ciudad de Guayaquil was a professional tennis tournament played on outdoor red clay courts. It was the fifth edition of the tournament which was part of the 2009 ATP Challenger Tour. It took place in Guayaquil, Ecuador between 9 and 15 November 2009.

ATP entrants

Seeds

 Rankings are as of November 2, 2009.

Other entrants
The following players received wildcards into the singles main draw:
  Emilio Gómez
  Roberto Quiroz
  Daniil Sirota
  Mariano Zabaleta

The following players received entry from the qualifying draw:
  Rogério Dutra da Silva
  Guido Pella
  Lars Pörschke
  Pedro Sousa

Champions

Singles

 Nicolás Lapentti def.  Santiago Giraldo, 6–2, 2–6, 7–6(4)

Doubles

 Júlio César Campozano /  Emilio Gómez def.  Andreas Haider-Maurer /  Lars Pörschke, 6–7(2), 6–3, [10–8]

External links
Official website
ITF Search 
Singles Draw
Doubles Draw

Challenger Ciudad de Guayaquil
Clay court tennis tournaments
Tennis tournaments in Ecuador
Challenger Ciudad de Guayaquil